Shutonia variabilis is a species of sea snail, a marine gastropod mollusk in the family Pseudomelatomidae, the turrids and allies.

Description
The length of the shell attains 18.5 mm, its diameter 6 mm.

(Original description) The elongately fusiform shell has a long siphonal canal. it is thin and yellowish-white. The shell contains eight whorls, of which about 2 (if normal) form a smooth, slightly inflated, reddish-brown protoconch. The subsequent whorls are subangular, concave in their upper part and separated by a conspicuous waved suture. The sculpture consists of a row of tubercles at the periphery, sharper in upper whorls, more obtuse lower on, a row of granules, just below the suture, becoming scarcely visible in last whorl and entirely or nearly wanting in some specimens. The lower part of the whorls show one or two rather faint, spiral lirae. The part of the last whorl below the keel shows more or less conspicuous spirals, which vary from regular flat lirae to more irregular riblike ones. In the latter case mainly two spirals are stronger. Moreover, there are extremely fine spiral striae and rather conspicuous growth-striae. The aperture is elongated and angular above. The peristome is thin, with a wide sinus above, then protracted. The columellar margin is nearly straight, only slightly concave above, ending in a rather long, narrow siphonal canal, covered with a thin layer of enamel. The interior of the aperture is smooth.

Distribution
This marine species occurs off Indonesia and in the Andaman Sea and off Thailand.

References

  Schepman, M. 1913. p. 425 [ Six specimens out of ten from Schepman 1913 were identified as Makiyamaia sibogae by Shuto 1970].

External links
 
 Gastropods.com: Shutonia variabilis

variabilis
Gastropods described in 1913